Heroidae is a family of sea slugs, nudibranchs, marine gastropod molluscs in the clade Nudipleura. There are no subfamilies in Heroidae.

The only genus in the family is Hero and it has two known species, Hero blanchardi and Hero formosa.

References 
Sea Slug Forum species list

 
Monogeneric mollusc families
Taxa named by John Edward Gray